Beaumont Transit is a transit agency providing public transport bus services primarily in the community of Beaumont, California, United States. The agency operates fixed-route local services, commuter express buses to nearby communities and curb-to-curb Dial a Ride services to certified passengers.

Route list 
Beaumont Transit a total of eight routes. On weekdays, there are two fixed-route local services, three commuter express routes, and two school-day only routes. On weekends there is one local fixed-route service and one commuter express route. No service is provided on Sunday.
 Route 3 – Weekday service to Walmart, Sundance, Beaumont High, both middle schools, Chatigny Rec Center, and portions of Cherry Valley.
 Route 4 – Weekday service to Walmart, Chatigny Rec Center, Beaumont Library, mid-town Beaumont, and both middle schools. Alternate route upon request to the industrial area of Beaumont including Amazon and Wolverine as well as to Three Rings Ranch Park.
 Route 3/4 – Saturday service from Cherry Valley to Beaumont via Pennsylvania Ave including Beaumont Library, Walmart, and 6th Street.
 Route 7 – School day service to Fairway Canyon, Tournament Hills, Beaumont High School, and both middle schools.
 Route 9 – School day service to Seneca Springs, Beaumont High School, and both middle schools.
 Casino Express – Weekday service connecting Beaumont to the Cabazon Outlets and Morongo Casino, Resort & Spa.
 Commuter Link 120 – Weekday and Saturday service connecting Beaumont to the San Bernardino Transit Center.
 Commuter Link 125 – Weekday service connecting Beaumont to Redlands and the Loma Linda University Medical Center.

References

External links 

Public transportation in Riverside County, California
Bus transportation in California
Beaumont, California
Cabazon, California
Transit authorities with natural gas buses
San Gorgonio Pass